Association Sportive DPHB, known as Al Sikkat Al Hadid Wal Marfa' in Arabic, was a multi-sports club based in Forn El Chebbak, a district in Beirut, Lebanon.

DPHB, which was the sports club of the Lebanese railways company, was mainly known for their football team. They also used to practice basketball, volleyball, table tennis, and swimming. DPHB won the Lebanese Premier League three times: in 1935–36, 1938–39, and 1940–41.

History 
In 1935, DPHB played at the inaugural game of the Beirut Municipal Stadium with players such as Camille Cordahi and Joseph Nalbandian.

Five DPHB players were present in Lebanon's lineup during their first international match against Mandatory Palestine in 1940: Yeghishe Darian, Antoine Sakr, Toufic Barbir, Nercesse, and Cordahi.

Honours
 Lebanese Premier League
 Winners (3): 1935–36, 1938–39, 1940–41
Lebanese FA Cup
Runners-up (1): 1939–40

Notelist

References

 
Defunct football clubs in Lebanon
Football clubs in Lebanon
Association football clubs disestablished in 1942